Tommy Leclercq (born 1970) is a Belgian politician who has been governor of the province of Hainaut, Belgium, since March 2013.

Life
Leclercq was born in Charleroi on 19 June 1970.

He obtained a master's degree in Labour Studies at the Université Libre de Bruxelles in 1997 and a European Certificate of University Education in Social Labour from Paris 12 Val de Marne University in 1998.

On 28 March 2013 he became governor of the province of Hainaut, at the time the youngest provincial governor in Belgium.

Publications
La Wallonie vue par les grands écrivains, Editions Luc Pire, 2011
Lobbes ma commune, self-published, 2012

References

External links

https://www.cumuleo.be/mandataire/4436-tommy-leclercq.php
http://www.lanouvellegazette.be/692470/article/regions/centre/actualite/2013-03-28/province-du-hainaut-tommy-leclercq-le-nouveau-gouverneur-a-prete-serment
http://www.nordeclair.be/683127/article/regions/mouscron/actualite/2013-03-14/hainaut-tommy-leclercq-est-notre-nouveau-gouverneur
http://www.laprovince.be/1546043/article/2016-04-10/le-gouverneur-du-hainaut-ne-mache-pas-ses-mots
https://ibz.be/fr/services-federaux-aupres-des-gouverneurs
http://www.notele.be/list14-l-info-en-continu-media23917-tommy-leclercq-designe-gouverneur-du-hainaut.html

1970 births
Living people
Governors of Hainaut (province)